Fulneck School is a small independent day and boarding school, situated in the Fulneck Moravian Settlement, in Pudsey, West Yorkshire, England. It provides education for pupils between the ages of 3 and 18. The School is part of the Fulneck estate which includes the Church, Museum, multiple resident buildings and shops and is named after Fulnek, Czechia.

History

The History of the Fulneck Settlement can be traced back to the Proto Protestant reformer Jan Huss. His teachings that the Bible should be translated into vernacular tongue (In this case Czech), his opposition to Simony (which was wide spread at the time) and the existence of Purgatory lead to him being excommunicated, deemed a heretic and burnt at the stake in 1415. The resulting Hussite wars would see the Hussites crushed and Catholicism re-established as the dominant Religion in Bohemia. The Hussites of the 15th century would evolve into what is now the Moravian Church.

In the 18th century Moravian Nicolaus Zinzendorf (Count Zinzendorf) attempted to spread the Moravian Church outside of Bohemia and his native Saxony. The Church bought the land that would become Fulneck in 1744 but the Fulneck Moravian Church would not be established until 1749 and the School 4 years later in 1753. It was progressive for the time as it educated both Boys and Girls. The influx of Moravians was not welcomed locally and many Moravians feared for their safety in case of a possible pogrom. The Moravians built many underground tunnels leading outside the site in case they needed to escape in an emergency, these tunnels although not in use can still be seen today.

In the late 19th century the office of Headmaster was abolished and the school was made into separate Boys and Girls Schools with separate Head Teachers, in 1994 the 2 schools were reunited after the former suffered financial difficulties. The Head Teacher of the Girl's school became Principal of the whole school.

In 2008 the school reopened a building and renamed it the Robinson Building,(it used to be the science block for the boys' school) which now serves as a learning centre for maths, geography, art and food technology. In 2014 the school extensively refurbished Joan Mort House, the building that houses the Sixth Form Centre.

When Fulneck first opened, the pupils would sleep at the top of the church. Now the school has boarding facilities, which are located on the upper floors of the main school building.

Fulneck School has a Learning Support Unit and has been registered as a "DU" category school by CReSTeD (Council for the 
Registration of Schools Teaching Dyslexic Pupils), which means it has a designated unit for the teaching of pupils with dyslexia on a one-to-one or small-group basis. Fulneck is one of only a few mainstream schools in the North of England to be registered "DU". Its dyslexic pupils perform exceptionally in GCSE and A level exams each year, due to the support they receive.

Fulneck is a non-selective school with an inclusive admissions policy. Children of all academic abilities are stretched, challenged and supported, with high achievers gaining A* and A grades. The majority of students in the Sixth Form go on to study at university while some enter apprenticeships and employment. Some students take part in a Multiflight training scheme at Leeds Bradford airport and a limited number have gone on to pilot training at Oxford Aviation Academy.

While The School is still technically a Religious School (the Church is still operated by a Reverend, Church service is part of the day and students are required to sign Hymns). Many students and staff openly follow other religions and most refuse to sing in Church. Furthermore, the School does not teach the Moravian religion in RS lessons.

Contemporary history

In 2019 the school changed the name of their houses from Griffin, Pegasus, and Phoenix to Asquith, Wolstenholme and Oastler respectively.

In 2020 Fulneck decisively won the 2020 History Bee and Bowl of Northern England (despite having a team of 2).

Recently their lease to the "Comenius Centre" (Named after John Amos Comenius) was revoked. The building which housed the Music and Drama department had to be reallocated. The Music Room took over the old Junior Science Room.

There have been calls by Muslim students to introduce Halal food as an option for School lunches and for Girls to be allowed to wear Trousers of which only the latter was granted.

The school is proud of its history and in its "East Hall" there are displays of former Captains of School, Past Principals (Dating back to 1753) and in the church a list of all reverends since 1749.

Notable former pupils

H. H. Asquith (1852–1928), politician, Prime Minister of the United Kingdom 1908–16
Major Booth (1886–1916), Yorkshire and England cricketer
Benjamin Henry Latrobe (1764–1820), architect
James Montgomery (1771–1854), hymnist, poet and editor
Victor Quelch (1891–1975), Canadian politician 
Diana Rigg (1938–2020), actress appearing in The Avengers
Sir Robert Robinson (1886–1975), Nobel laureate in chemistry
Frederic Shoberl (1775–1853), Writer
Elizabeth Clarke Wolstenholme Elmy (1833–1918) suffragist, life-long campaigner and organiser

References

An example of university destinations of Fulneck School

https://web.archive.org/web/20160304095838/https://fluencycontent-schoolwebsite.netdna-ssl.com/FileCluster/Fulneck/Mainfolder/home/docs/Senior-and-Sixth-Form/Sixth-Form-Leaver-Destinations-2012-13.pdf

External links
Moravian Schools

Educational institutions established in 1994
Educational institutions of the British Province of the Moravian Church
Private schools in Leeds
Boarding schools in West Yorkshire
1994 establishments in England
Pudsey